Nando is a town in Anambra East Local Government Area of Anambra State, Nigeria. It is located at the Awkuzu junction boundary with Nteje, Aguleri and Igbariam.

Origin 
Nando is the fourth and last son of Iguedo. The others being Ogbunike, Umueri and Awkuzu.

Iguedo 
There have been numerous accounts on the life and person of Iguedo. Her history seems to have been a greater puzzle to Historians than that of Eri. However, none of the accounts about her can be out-rightly and correctly accepted or rejected as some of the data came purely through oral tradition and scanty archaeological discoveries although there is near unanimity in the various accounts concerning the strong connection between an individual called Iguedo and the towns that constitute Umu-Iguedo clan.

One of the more accepted opinions hold that she was a daughter of Eri. It is said to have had two wives. The first bore five children: Agulu (founder of Aguleri); Nri Ifiakuanim; Nri Onugu (founder of Igbariam); Ogbodudu (the founder of Amanuke); and a daughter, Iguedo, who bore the founders of Ogbunike, Awkuzu, Umuleri and Nando. The smissind wife, Oboli, gave birth to Onoju who left the Anambra area and became the founder of Igala land.

A second group of thought attempted to tag her as Eri's daughter who was allowed by her father to bear children at home without been married. However, the Oral tradition of the entire Iguedo clans disagree with this assertion as it would have amount to bastardization of Culture if Eri made such a taboo as all of their tradition indicates paternal origin.

A third opinion asserts that Iguedo came from either Agukwu or Onitsha. However, not many people share this view. That Iguedo came from Agukwu (Nri) could be an attempt to explain her relationship with the people of Nri. If she is said to have come from Onitsha, that may again be an effort to account for the profound respect which some parts of Onitsha accord her. It was very well known that olili-nne-Iguedo was celebrated by some Onitsha indigenes.

Iguedo's relationship with the people of Onitsha is supported by an oral tradition that asserts that the progenitors of the towns of Umu-Iguedo clan were born out of successive marriages of Iguedo to several men. She had first married and gave birth to Ogbunike, and Awkuzu . Later, she married Okebo from Eddah, and the fruit of their marriage was Umu-ulu-eri (progenitor of Umuleri). Finally, Nnamovo, a man who was believed to have come from Onitsha married Iguedo and she gave birth to Nando. It was in the land founded by Nando that Iguedo died and was buried.

Her Death 
On her death at Nando after a lengthy protracted sickness, Nando was said to have invited the rest of the Umu-Iguedo clans (Ogbunike, Awkuzu, Umuleri) for burial arrangement and also sent a message to the other children of Nnammeyi (Nneyi Umuleri) informing them of their mother's death. But then there was commotion and arguments on where to bury her body. Ogbunike who was the eldest of the Iguedos wanted the body to be taken home (Ogbunike) for burial since they are the children of the first child but Nando Objected on the ground that they were the people that took care of her during her old age. Unknown to all of them, Umuleri delegates went outside for private talk and after deciding among themselves that their mother's's corpse would not be lost to others returned singing war music. They further proceeded to cut off her head and took it home with them where it was buried in Nneyi Umuleri at Aro Shrine in present-day mmanoma Nneyi Umuleri.

Today the trace of her tomb is found in the Shrine of the Aro Oracle of Umueri while her body was finally buried in Ubaruisioye Nando. In order to commemorate her memorial, there was a traditional annual Iguaro & "Oriri nne Iguedo" celebrated in Nneyi Umueri and Nando respectively till this very day. And all her Children and relatives are expected to be there for the rituals.

Structure 
Nando comprises eight villages: Agbudu, Akamanato, Abube-Agu, Abube-Uno, Isinyi, Ikem, Ubarunisioye and Umuawo.

Traditional Leadership 
Nando community was originally led by one Igwe who was from Agbudu village (the eldest of the eight). However, when Nando became an autonomous community, fighting ensued over which village would produce the Igwe. This fight was mostly between Ikem and Abube-Agu. However, Igwe Odibefa of Agbudu Nando is still the most recognized Igwe in Nando.

Markets 
Nando has a large central market called the Nkwo market which is located at the intersection between Agbudu, the roads leading to Ubarunisioye, Ikem and Abube-uno. However, each village also has its own small market such as the Afor market of Ikem, the Eke market of Abube-Agu and the Eke market of Ubarunisioye.

Festivities 
Nando people have their special festival period called Onwa Nge during the month of May, during which different masquerades come out to entertain the people and display their various colourful attires.

References 

 About Ogbunike

Sources 

Towns in Anambra State